Estádio Fredis Saldívar, commonly known as Douradão, is a multi-use stadium in Dourados, Brazil. It is currently used mostly for football matches. The stadium holds 30,000. It was built in 1986.

Douradão is owned by the Mato Grosso do Sul state government and by the Dourados City Hall. The stadium is named after Fredis Saldívar, who donated the groundplot where the stadium was built.

History
In 1986, the works on Douradão were completed. The inaugural match was played on April 12 of that year, when Ubiratan beat Mixto 4–2. The first goal of the stadium was scored by Ubiratan's Ademir Patrício.

The stadium's attendance record currently stands at 18,780, set on July 17, 1988 when Ubiratan and Operário de Dourados drew 1-1.

References

Enciclopédia do Futebol Brasileiro, Volume 2 - Lance, Rio de Janeiro: Aretê Editorial S/A, 2001.

External links
Templos do Futebol

Football venues in Mato Grosso do Sul
Sports venues in Mato Grosso do Sul